Troy Township is a township in Iowa County, Iowa, USA.

History
Troy Township was established in 1856.

References

Townships in Iowa County, Iowa
Townships in Iowa
1856 establishments in Iowa